Zojz is a sky and lightning god in Albanian pagan mythology. Regarded as the chief god and the highest of all gods, Zojz had been worshiped in northern Albania until the early 20th century. The cult practiced by the Albanians on Mount Tomorr in central Albania is considered as a continuation of the ancient sky-god worship. In classical antiquity Zojz is considered to have been worshiped by Illyrians as the ancestors of the Albanians. Albanian Zojz is clearly the equivalent and cognate of Messapic Zis and Ancient Greek Zeus (all from Proto-Indo-European *Di̯ḗu̯s 'sky god').

An epithet considered to be associated with the sky-god is "father", thought to be contained in the Albanian noun Zot ("Sky Father", from Proto-Albanian: *dźie̅u ̊ a(t)t-), used to refer to the Supreme Being. In Albanian the god who rules the sky is referred to as i Bukuri i Qiellit ("the Beauty of the Sky"), the counterpart of e Bukura e Dheut (the Beauty of the Earth) and e Bukura e Detit (the Beauty of the Sea), who also appear in Albanian folklore. In some of his attributes, the Albanian sky and lightning god could be related to the presumable sky and weather god Perëndi (another name for the Supreme Being), to the father god Baba Tomor, to the weather and storm god Shurdh, and to the mythological demigod Drangue.

Name

Etymology 

Zojz is the Albanian continuation of *Di̯ḗu̯s, the name of the Proto-Indo-European daylight-sky-god. Cognates stemming from the noun *Di̯ḗu̯s with a similar phonological development are the Messapic Zis and Greek Zeus. In the Albanian Zoj-z, Messapic Zis, and Greek Ζεύς, the original cluster *di̯ of *di̯ḗu̯s underwent affrication to *dz. In Albanian it further assibilated into *z. Other Indo-European cognates are the Rigvedic Dyáuṣ and Latin Jovis. This root is thought to be found also in the second element (dí/día/dei) of the name Perëndi, used in Albanian to refer to the Supreme Being.

Epithets

Sky Father 
The zero grade radical of *di̯ḗu̯s and the epithet "father" are thought to be contained in an Albanian noun for the Supreme Being, Zot. It is traditionally considered to be derived from Proto-Albanian *dźie̅u ̊ a(t)t-, an old compound for 'heavenly father' stemming PIE *dyew- ('sky, heaven, bright') attached to *átta ('father'), thus a cognate to PIE *Dyḗus ph₂tḗr and with its various descendants: Illyrian Dei-pátrous, Sanskrit द्यौष्पितृ (Dyáuṣ Pitṛ́), Proto-Italic *djous patēr (whence Latin Iuppiter), Ancient Greek Ζεῦ πάτερ (Zeû páter). Alternatively, some linguists have also proposed the Proto-Albanian etymology *dzwâpt (from *w(i)tš- pati-, 'lord of the house'; ultimately from PIE *wiḱ-potis, 'leader of the clan').

The variant ζόνε Zonë, attested in Albanian oaths like περ τένε ζόνε, për tënë Zonë, "By our God/Lord", and in Old Albanian texts for Pater Noster (Tënëzonë, tënë-Zonë), is equivalent to the Albanian accusative Zótënë/Zótnë, obtained through the assimilation of -tënë/-tnë into -në. This Albanian variant may be regarded as a masculine counterpart of the feminine Dióne, parallel to Latin Dianus and Diana (cf. also the Albanian mythological figure of Zana). At the sanctuary of Dodona Zeus is paired with Dione, and the geographical coincidence of the Albanian case is remarkable.

 Beauty of the Sky 
In Albanian the god/lord of the sky/heaven is also referred to as i Bukuri i Qiellit 'the Beauty of the Sky', the counterpart of e Bukura e Dheut 'the Beauty of the Earth' and e Bukura e Detit 'the Beauty of the Sea', who also appear in Albanian folklore.

 Folk beliefs 
In classical antiquity Zojz is considered to have been worshiped by Illyrians as the ancestors of the Albanians. Albanian Zojz is clearly the equivalent and cognate of Messapic Zis and Ancient Greek Zeus, the continuations of the Proto-Indo-European *Di̯ḗu̯s 'sky god'.

In the pre-Christian pagan period the term Zot was presumably used in Albanian to refer to the sky father/god/lord, father-god, heavenly father (the Indo-European father daylight-sky-god). After the first access of the ancestors of the Albanians to the Christian religion in antiquity the term Zot has been used for God, the Father and the Son (Christ).

Considered as the chief god and the highest of all gods, Zojz had been worshiped in the Zadrima region in northern Albania until the early 20th century. The local people used to swear "Pasha Zojzin!". According to the elders, Zojzi lives among the clouds with a thunderbolt in his hand. It was believed that he notices the deeds of the people, who are frightened by his power because when he realises that people are sinning, he brings them destruction hurling his thunderbolt on the trees and the tall buildings, and burning and smashing the sinners. Local Albanian mythology has it that Zojz has a son and a daughter. His son is called Plutoni (cf. the Ancient Greek Pluto), the god of fire and the underworld. With the fire in his hand, he holds control of the center of the earth. Plutoni used to be worshiped as well. Zojz's daughter is the goddess Prende, widely worshiped in northern Albania.

According to Albanian folk beliefs, Zojz resides on the peak of mountains such as Mount Tomorr, the highest and most inaccessible mountain of central Albania, considered the home of the deities. This tradition has been preserved in folk beliefs until recent times. The enduring sanctity of the mountain, the annual pilgrimage to its summit, and the solemn sacrifice of a white bull by the local people provide abundant evidence that the ancient cult of the sky-god on Mount Tomorr continues through the generations almost untouched by the course of political events and religious changes.

The god of the sky/heaven is regarded as the one who makes the sky cloudy or clears it up, and he is referred to as "the Beauty of the Sky". The ancestors of the Albanians presumably had in common with the Ancient Greek theogony the tripartite division of the administration of the world into heaven, sea, and underworld, and in the same functions as the Greek deities Zeus, Poseidon, and Hades, they would have worshiped the deities referred to as the Beauty of the Sky (i Bukuri i Qiellit), the Beauty of the Sea (e Bukura e Detit), and the Beauty of the Earth (e Bukura e Dheut). The phrase "the Beauty of the Sky" continues to be used to refer to the monotheistic God in Albanian, the Beauty of the Sea and the Beauty of the Earth are kept as figures of Albanian folk beliefs and fairy tales.

 Relation with the Sun 

The Albanian oath taken "by the eye of the sun" or "by the star" (për atë hyll) is related to the Sky-God worship. The sun is considered "the Beauty of the Sky" (i Bukuri i Qiellit) by the Albanians. Oaths taken "by the sky" (për atë qiell), "by the sun" (për atë diell), "by the ray of light" (për këtë rreze drite) and "by the sunbeam" (për këtë rreze dielli) are often sworn by the Albanians. During the ceremonial ritual of celebration of the first day of spring (Albanian: Dita e Verës''), "the Beauty of the Sky" is the human who is dressed in yellow personifying the sun, worshiped as the giver of life and the god of light, who fade away the darkness of the world and melts the frost.
In an Arbëreshë folk song of mythological nature, E Bija e Hënës dhe e Diellit ("the Daughter of the Moon and the Sun") is described as the lightning of the sky which falls everywhere from heaven on the mountains and the valleys and strikes pride and evil. Described in some traditions with a star on her forehead and a moon on her chest, her victory over the kulshedra symbolizes the supremacy of the deity of the sky over that of the underworld.

See also 

Albanian mythology
Drangue
En (deity)
Perëndi
Shurdh
Verbt

References

Notes

Citations

Bibliography 

Albanian mythology
Sky and weather gods
Thunder gods
Illyrian gods